The Kemper Open was a golf tournament on the PGA Tour from 1968 to 2006.

Perhaps more so than any other "regular" PGA Tour stop, the event wandered about, not just from course to course within a given metropolitan area, but along the East Coast. Originally sponsored by the Kemper Corporation, the inaugural event was played in 1968 at Pleasant Valley Country Club in Sutton, Massachusetts, before moving to the Quail Hollow Club in Charlotte, North Carolina the following year, where it stayed through 1979.  (The Wells Fargo Championship is now held in Charlotte.)  The event moved in 1980 to Congressional Country Club in Bethesda, Maryland, a suburb northwest of Washington, D.C., and to TPC at Avenel in 1987 in  neighboring Potomac. 

Kemper Insurance dropped out as sponsor after the 2002 edition and was replaced by Friedman Billings Ramsey, which renamed the event the FBR Capital Open for a single year in 2003. Booz Allen Hamilton became the main sponsor in 2004, with the tournament being titled the Booz Allen Classic. The event returned to Congressional for a year in 2005 to accommodate renovations at Avenel.

The purse in 2006 was $5.0 million, with $900,000 going to the winner; due to rain delays it concluded on Tuesday without a gallery. In 1992, Washington Redskins quarterback Mark Rypien, the reigning Super Bowl MVP, was given a sponsor's exemption into the tournament,  but shot rounds of 80 and 91 and missed the cut by 28 strokes. As the Kemper Open, it was often played two or three weeks prior to the U.S. Open, making it a prime tune-up event; later it was either the week prior or after and many top players skipped it.. For 2007, the PGA Tour announced that it would reschedule the event for the fall, and Booz Allen declined to renew its sponsorship.  The fall date was in turn canceled to make way for the new AT&T National, to take place at the same time as the Classic had.

Also in 2006, the tournament ended on Tuesday due to persistent storms in the D.C. area. The conclusion of what turned out to be the final Booz Allen Classic was not televised.

A new format (invitation only), new host for the tournament (Tiger Woods), and a return to Congressional Country Club marked the July 2007 stop in Washington for the FedEx Cup, the AT&T National.  For record-keeping purposes, it is not a "successor" tournament officially, even though it is the "new" tour stop in the same region.

During the 1970s, the Kemper Open was among the highest purses on tour, exceeding the majors.

Tournament highlights
 1968: Arnold Palmer shoots a final round 67 to win the inaugural version of the tournament. He finishes four shots ahead of Bruce Crampton and Art Wall Jr.
 1971: Tom Weiskopf wins his first Kemper Open title in a four-way sudden death playoff. He makes an eight-foot birdie putt on the first extra hole to beat Lee Trevino, Gary Player, and Dale Douglass.
 1972: Doug Sanders rolls in a 30-foot birdie putt on the 72nd hole to edge Lee Trevino by one shot. It would be Sanders 20th and final PGA Tour triumph.
 1975: Raymond Floyd holes a 100-foot chip shot for eagle during the final round on his way to a three-shot victory over Gary Player and John Mahaffey. It is Floyd's first PGA Tour win since his 1969 PGA Championship triumph.
 1977: Tom Weiskopf wins the Kemper Open for a third time. He beats Bill Rogers and George Burns by two shots.
 1980: John Mahaffey wins the first Kemper Open played at the Congressional Country Club. He beats Craig Stadler by three shots.
 1982: Craig Stadler becomes the first Kemper Open winner to successfully defend his title. He beats Seve Ballesteros by seven shots.
 1983: This edition of the tournament may have been the most bizarre. Fred Couples, Scott Simpson,  and Chen Tze-chung playing together in the final group finished over one hour later than the previous group on the golf course. In spite of rounds of 77, 76, and 77 all three players finished tied for first along with Gil Morgan and Barry Jaeckel who had finished their rounds several hours earlier. Jaeckel, who spent time in a bar waiting for regulation play to conclude, is eliminated on the first playoff hole after he hits a wild tee shot. On the second hole,  Couples scores a birdie to win his first ever PGA Tour title.
 1984: Greg Norman wins his first PGA Tour event, beating out Mark O'Meara by five shots, despite shooting a final round 73.
 1985: Bill Glasson sinks a 50-foot birdie putt on the 72nd hole to finish a 7-shot comeback and earn his first ever PGA Tour triumph. He beats Larry Mize and Corey Pavin by one shot.
 1986: Greg Norman wins the Kemper Open for a second time by defeating Larry Mize on the sixth hole of a sudden death playoff. Less than one year later, Mize would avenge his loss to Norman at the 1987 Masters Tournament.
 1988: Tom Kite's bid to successfully defend his Kemper Open title is foiled when Morris Hatalsky beats him on the second hole of a sudden death playoff.
 1992: Bill Glasson becomes the first and only tournament champion to win an edition of the tournament at both Congressional Country Club and TPC at Avenel. Glasson wins by one shot over Howard Twitty, Ken Green, Mike Springer, and John Daly.
 1995: Lee Janzen birdies the 72nd hole to earn a spot in a sudden death playoff with Corey Pavin. Janzen then birdies the first playoff hole to earn the victory.
 1996: Future number two ranked player in the world, Steve Stricker, wins for the first time on the PGA Tour. He beats Mark O'Meara, Grant Waite, Scott Hoch, and Brad Faxon by three shots.
 1997: Justin Leonard wins for the second time ever on the PGA Tour after Mark Wiebe misses two-foot par putts on both the 71st and 72nd holes to finish one shot behind.
 1999: Rich Beem becomes the first ever PGA Tour rookie to win the tournament. His four round scoring total of 274 (−10) is good enough for a one-stroke triumph over Bradley Hughes and Bill Glasson.
 2004: Adam Scott shoots  a 72-hole tournament scoring record 263 on his way to a four-shot victory over Charles Howell III.

Winners

References

External links
 PGATOUR.com Tournament website

1968 establishments in Massachusetts
2006 disestablishments in Maryland
Booz Allen Hamilton
Former PGA Tour events
Golf in Maryland
Golf in North Carolina
Golf in Massachusetts
History of Worcester County, Massachusetts
Recurring sporting events established in 1968
Recurring sporting events disestablished in 2006
Sports competitions in Maryland
Sports competitions in North Carolina
Sports competitions in Massachusetts
Sports in Worcester County, Massachusetts
Sutton, Massachusetts
Tourist attractions in Worcester County, Massachusetts